SkyOne Federal Credit Union is a US credit union, headquartered in Hawthorne, California, it is federally insured by the National Credit Union Administration and is an Equal Housing Lender. It offers financial services to all who qualify.

History
SkyOne Federal Credit Union was founded in July 1949 as CAA First Federal Credit Union with eight members to serve the Civil Aeronautics Administration employees and their dependents. In 1978, the credit union changed its name from CAA to FAA and was serving FAA employees in 13 Western states.

In January 2010 FAA First FCU again changed its name to SkyOne FCU in order to reflect as a nationwide brand. The new branding helped the credit union to better identify with its membership open to those working in the air transportation industry. In 2008, SkyOne partnered with the United Insurance Partners to give its members access to purchase auto, homeowner and RV insurance from more than 15 insurance providers at competitive rates.

As of October 2022, SkyOne FCU had more than $792 million in assets, and over 44,000 members worldwide.

Membership
SkyOne's field of membership is set by the National Credit Union Administration. As with all credit unions, membership in SkyOne used to be limited to individuals sharing the common bond defined in its credit union charter. Membership in SkyOne is no longer limited to air transportation employees and their dependents who live and work in the United States. Anyone in good standing with ChexSystems can join by selecting either CA PTA, Surfrider Foundation, American Consumer Council, or Friends of Madrona Marsh when applying. You also have to be in good standing with SkyOne Federal Credit Union.

Services
SkyOne offers a suite of account services offered by most financial institutions, including checking and savings accounts, individual retirement accounts, money market accounts, auto and motorcycle loans, personal loans, lines of credit options, real estate loans, mortgage loans, home equity loans, certificates, and credit cards. The company also provides online and mobile banking, insurance, financial planning, investment, and online bill pay options.

Awards and recognition
2014- Received the Marketing award from the Internet Marketing Association.
2015- Awarded for outstanding communications by the Marketing Association of Credit Unions 
2016- Honored with a Diamond award by the Credit Union National Association.

References

Banks established in 1949
Credit unions based in California